Beltrami County is a county in the northern part of the U.S. state of Minnesota. As of the 2020 census, the population was 46,228. Its county seat is Bemidji. The county's name comes from Italian adventurer Giacomo Beltrami from Bergamo, who explored the area in 1825. The county was created in 1866 and organized in 1896.

Beltrami County comprises the Bemidji, MN Micropolitan Statistical Area.

Portions of the Leech Lake and Red Lake Indian reservations are in the county. The northernmost portion of the Mississippi River flows through the southern part of the county, through Bemidji. Beltrami, Renville, and Stearns are Minnesota's only counties that abut nine other counties.

Geography
Beltrami County's southwest corner is considered part of the headwaters of the Mississippi River, which flows easterly and northeasterly from Lake Itasca through the southern part of the county. Much of the middle and upper county is taken up with the two sections of Red Lake. The county terrain consists of rolling low tree-covered hills, dotted with lakes and ponds. The terrain slopes to the east and north. Its highest point is a small hill 1.3 mile (2.1 km) northwest of Wolf Lake, at 1,511' (460m) ASL; otherwise the terrain high point is near its southwest corner, at 1,457' (444m) ASL. It is the fourth-largest county in Minnesota by area.

Major highways

  U.S. Highway 2
  U.S. Highway 71
  Minnesota State Highway 1
  Minnesota State Highway 72
  Minnesota State Highway 89
  Minnesota State Highway 197

Adjacent counties

 Lake of the Woods County - north
 Koochiching County - northeast
 Itasca County - east
 Cass County - southeast
 Hubbard County - south
 Clearwater County - southwest
 Pennington County - west
 Marshall County - west
 Roseau County - northwest

Protected areas

 Bagley Lake State Wildlife Management Area (part)
 Buena Vista State Forest
 Chippewa National Forest (part)
 Lake Bemidji State Park
 Long Lake State Wildlife Management Area
 Mississippi Headwaters State Forest (part)
 Pine Island State Forest (part)
 Red Lake Peatland Scientific and Natural Area (part)
 Three Island Lake County Park

Climate and weather

Demographics

As of the 2000 census, there were 39,650 people, 14,337 households, and 9,749 families in the county. The population density was 15.8/sqmi (6.11/km2). There were 16,989 housing units at an average density of 6.78/sqmi (2.62/km2). The racial makeup of the county was 76.66% White, 0.36% Black or African American, 20.36% Native American, 0.57% Asian, 0.02% Pacific Islander, 0.21% from other races, and 1.84% from two or more races. 0.99% of the population were Hispanic or Latino of any race. 21.6% were of German, 19.7% Norwegian and 5.6% Swedish ancestry. 95.1% spoke English and 2.4% Ojibwa as their first language.

There were 14,337 households, out of which 34.60% had children under the age of 18 living with them, 49.30% were married couples living together, 13.60% had a female householder with no husband present, and 32.00% were non-families. 24.80% of all households were made up of individuals, and 9.50% had someone living alone who was 65 years of age or older.  The average household size was 2.63 and the average family size was 3.13.

The county population contained 28.70% under the age of 18, 13.90% from 18 to 24, 25.20% from 25 to 44, 20.50% from 45 to 64, and 11.70% who were 65 years of age or older. The median age was 32 years. For every 100 females there were 97.30 males. For every 100 females age 18 and over, there were 93.50 males.

The median income for a household in the county was $33,392, and the median income for a family was $40,345. Males had a median income of $30,434 versus $22,045 for females. The per capita income for the county was $15,497. About 12.90% of families and 17.60% of the population were below the poverty line, including 21.70% of those under age 18 and 12.20% of those age 65 or over.

Over half the children in the county are born out of wedlock. About a third are born to teenaged mothers. The county has about twice the state average in terms of high school dropouts.

2020 Census

Crime
Between 1990 and 2005, the county had a suicide rate four times higher than the state. The county exceeds the state and national rates in both violent and property crimes.

Communities

Cities

 Bemidji (county seat)
 Blackduck
 Funkley
 Kelliher
 Solway
 Tenstrike
 Turtle River
 Wilton

Townships

 Alaska Township
 Battle Township
 Bemidji Township
 Benville Township
 Birch Township
 Buzzle Township
 Cormant Township
 Durand Township
 Eckles Township
 Frohn Township
 Grant Valley Township
 Hagali Township
 Hamre Township
 Hines Township
 Hornet Township
 Jones Township
 Kelliher Township
 Lammers Township
 Langor Township
 Lee Township
 Liberty Township
 Maple Ridge Township
 Minnie Township
 Moose Lake Township
 Nebish Township
 Northern Township
 O'Brien Township
 Port Hope Township
 Quiring Township
 Roosevelt Township
 Shooks Township
 Shotley Township
 Spruce Grove Township
 Steenerson Township
 Sugar Bush Township
 Summit Township
 Taylor Township
 Ten Lake Township
 Turtle Lake Township
 Turtle River Township
 Waskish Township
 Woodrow Township

Unorganized territories

 Brook Lake
 Lower Red Lake
 North Beltrami
 Shotley Brook
 Upper Red Lake

Census-designated places

 Little Rock
 Ponemah
 Red Lake
 Redby

Unincorporated communities

 Andrusia
 Aure
 Carmel
 Debs
 Four Town
 Hines
 Jelle
 Pennington
 Pinewood
 Puposky
 Quiring
 Saum
 Secluded Acres
 Shooks
 Waskish
 Werner

Government and politics
From the New Deal realignment in 1932 through 1996, Beltrami County leaned Democratic, selecting the Democratic nominee in every presidential election save Eisenhower's landslides in 1952 and 1956 and Nixon's in 1972. In 2000, George W. Bush became the first Republican to carry the county since 1972. Bush fell short of a majority, with third parties (particularly Green nominee Ralph Nader) doing well statewide, but his 48.5% vote share was higher than any Republican's from 1964 to 1996 save Nixon in 1972 and Reagan in 1984. Beltrami returned to the Democratic column in the next three elections, but in 2016, Donald Trump became the second Republican since 1972 to carry the county, winning a bare majority; in 2020, he won it again, but the margin of victory shrank. 

On January 7, 2020, in response to Trump's executive order, the Beltrami County Board of Commissioners voted to prohibit refugees from resettling in the area.

Education
School districts include:
 Bemidji Public School District
 Blackduck Public School District
 Cass Lake-Bena Public Schools
 Kelliher Public School District
 Red Lake Public School District
 Grygla Public School District

See also
 Gilfillan Biotic Area
 National Register of Historic Places listings in Beltrami County, Minnesota
 Red Lake, the largest lake that is entirely in Minnesota.

References

External links
 Official website
 360 Degree Virtual Tour of 2011 Beltrami County Fair

 
Minnesota counties
1896 establishments in Minnesota
Populated places established in 1896
Minnesota counties on the Mississippi River